Nyamyn Narantuyaa (born 15 May 1961) is a Mongolian boxer. He competed in the men's flyweight event at the 1980 Summer Olympics. At the 1980 Summer Olympics, he lost to Armando Guevara of Venezuela.

References

External links
 

1961 births
Living people
Mongolian male boxers
Olympic boxers of Mongolia
Boxers at the 1980 Summer Olympics
Place of birth missing (living people)
Flyweight boxers
20th-century Mongolian people